McGinnity is a surname. Notable people with the surname include:

Gerard McGinnity, author and parish priest
Joseph McGinnity (1871–1929), American baseball player
Mike McGinnity, former chairman of Coventry City Football Club
Peter McGinnity (1953–), former Gaelic footballer and manager